The 2009 Tour de Pologne was the 66th running of the Tour de Pologne, in the 81st year since the first edition. The event was part of both the 2009 UCI ProTour and the inaugural World Calendar, and ran from 2–8 August, starting in Warsaw and finishing in Kraków.
After four stages that were dominated by sprint finishes, World champion Alessandro Ballan's participation in successful breaks in stages five and six, and bonus time for being first and second respectively in those stages, brought him overall victory.

Stages
There is a circuit of at least two laps on every stage.

Stage 1
2 August 2009 – Warsaw, 108 km

Stage 2
3 August 2009 – Serock to Białystok, 219.1 km

This stage was very flat, with only a fourth-category climb near the end. There was a three-lap, 6.5 km circuit at the finish.

Stage 3
4 August 2009 – Bielsk Podlaski to Lublin, 225.1 km

This course is mostly flat, though it becomes bumpy at the end. The 4.6 km finishing circuit includes multiple passes over a third-category climb.

Stage 4
5 August 2009 – Nałęczów to Rzeszów, 239.7 km

In a chaotic bunch sprint, Edvald Boasson Hagen led out teammate André Greipel. While Greipel and  sprinter Allan Davis grappled for his wheel, Boasson Hagen led on to take the win. Greipel was later relegated, and lost both the yellow and blue jersey to Jürgen Roelandts.

This course has a sloping profile, with two categorized climbs in the second half of the stage as well as an uncategorized hill coming after about 40 km. There is a three-lap finishing circuit again on this stage; it is 5.9 km long and flat.

Stage 5
6 August 2009 – Strzyżów to Krynica-Zdrój, 171.5 km

This is a high mountain stage, with a first-category climb coming after 105 km. There are two categorized climbs visited repeatedly in the four-lap 14.8 km finishing circuit, with mountains classification points taken for the first pass over them.

Stage 6
7 August 2009 – Krościenko nad Dunajcem to Zakopane, 162.2 km

This is the Tour de Pologne's most mountainous stage, with another mountain circuit. This circuit is four laps by 25 km, with two first-category climbs in it. There are two other first-category climbs on the course, so the course has ten first-category climbs.

Stage 7
8 August 2009 – Rabka-Zdrój to Kraków, 136.5 km

The beginning to this stage is jagged, with a second-category climb after 56 km as well as several uncategorized rises in elevation. The finish comes on a three-lap 4 km circuit which is perfectly flat.

Category leadership table

References

External links

 

Tour De Pologne
Tour de Pologne
Tour De Pologne, 2009
August 2009 sports events in Europe